The Rice-Semple-Haardt House is a historic house in Montgomery, Alabama, U.S..

History
The house was built in the early 1850s for Samuel Farrow Rice, who served as a member of the Alabama House of Representatives and the Alabama Senate, and later as Chief Justice of the Alabama Supreme Court.

In the late 1860s, the house was purchased by Henry Churchill Semple, a veteran of the Confederate States Army. The house remained in the Semple family until 1924. It was later acquired by John Haardt, a realtor, and used as offices.

By 1970, it was purchased by the state of Alabama.

Architectural significance
It has been listed on the National Register of Historic Places since September 27, 1972.

References

Houses on the National Register of Historic Places in Alabama
Houses completed in 1851
Houses in Montgomery, Alabama